Courts of Idaho include:
;State courts of Idaho
Idaho Supreme Court
Idaho Court of Appeals
Idaho District Courts (7 judicial districts)
Idaho Drug Court
Idaho Mental Health Court

Federal courts located in Idaho
United States District Court for the District of Idaho

References

External links
National Center for State Courts – directory of state court websites.

Courts in the United States
Idaho state courts